Siegbert M. Wirth (October 26, 1929 – October 12, 1999) was a U.S. soccer player who was a member of the U.S. soccer team at the 1956 Summer Olympics.  He played his college soccer at Syracuse University in 1950 and then again from 1952 to 1955.  Following his graduation from Syracuse, he entered the U.S. military.  While he was a member of the Olympic soccer team, he did not enter a game during the tournament. In 1990, he took over as head coach of the Mynderse Academy Varsity Boys Soccer Team where he took a team that won 2 games the previous season to the league championship. He coached Mynderse for the next 6 years.

References

American soccer players
Olympic soccer players of the United States
Footballers at the 1956 Summer Olympics
Syracuse Orange men's soccer players
1929 births
1999 deaths
Association football defenders